Parker Township may refer to:

 Parker Township, Nevada County, Arkansas, in Nevada County, Arkansas
 Parker Township, Clark County, Illinois
 Parker Township, Montgomery County, Kansas, in Montgomery County, Kansas
 Parker Township, Marshall County, Minnesota
 Parker Township, Morrison County, Minnesota
 Parker Township, Butler County, Pennsylvania
 Parker Township, Turner County, South Dakota, in Turner County, South Dakota

	
Township name disambiguation pages